The American Samoa Field Hockey Association  is the governing body of field hockey in American Samoa, Oceania. Its headquarters are in Pago Pago, American Samoa. It is affiliated to IHF International Hockey Federation and OCF Oceania Hockey Federation.

See also

Oceania Hockey Federation

References

National members of the Oceania Hockey Federation
Sports in American Samoa
Organizations based in American Samoa